Yuvacık (literally "little home" or "little nest" in Turkish) may refer to:

 The Turkish name of Chrysiliou, a village in northern Cyprus
 Yuvacık, Amasya, a village in the district of Amasya, Amasya Province, Turkey
 Yuvacık, Bitlis, a village
 Yuvacık, Çınar
 Yuvacık, Kaş, a village in the district of Kaş, Antalya Province, Turkey
 Yuvacık, Kulp